The Tower of Hercules is the oldest extant lighthouse known. Until the 20th century, it was known as the Farum Brigantium. The Latin word farum is derived from the Greek Φάρος, Pharos, for the Lighthouse of Alexandria. It was built in the 1st century and renovated in 1791.

The Tower of Hercules is a National Monument of Spain, and has been a UNESCO World Heritage Site since 27 June 2009. It is the second-tallest lighthouse in Spain, after the Faro de Chipiona.

Construction and history

The tower is known to have existed by the 1st century, built or perhaps rebuilt under Trajan, possibly on foundations following a design that was Phoenician in origin. Built with the original plans of the Lighthouse of Alexandria. Its base preserves a cornerstone with the inscription , permitting the original lighthouse tower to be ascribed to the architect Gaius Sevius Lupus, from Aeminium (present-day Coimbra, Portugal) in the former province of Lusitania, as an offering dedicated to the Roman god of war, Mars. The tower has been in constant use since the 2nd century and is considered to be the oldest extant lighthouse. The original tower was shorter and wider, as the surviving core was surrounded by a spiral ramp. The outline of this ramp is still visible in the restored exterior. The final storey was likely surmounted with a dome.

The earliest known reference to the lighthouse at Brigantium is by Paulus Orosius in   written around 415–417:

("At the second angle of the circuit circumnavigating Hispania, where the Gallaecian city of Brigantia is sited, a very tall lighthouse is erected among a few commemorative works, for looking towards Britannia.")

In 1788, the surviving  tower core was given a neoclassical restoration, including a new  fourth story. The restoration was undertaken by naval engineer Eustaquio Giannini during the reign of Charles III of Spain, and was finished in 1791. UNESCO praised the work: "The Tower of Hercules was restored in the 18th century in an exemplary manner, which has protected the central core of the original Roman monument while restoring its technical functions". Within, the much-repaired Roman and medieval masonry may be inspected.

The Romans who conquered this region of Spain believed it to be, in a figurative sense, the end of the Earth – hence its name, . This region is notorious for shipwrecks, earning it the name , "Coast of Death".

Myths

Through the millennia many mythical stories of the lighthouse's origin have been told. According to a myth that mixes Celtic and Greco-Roman elements, the hero Hercules slew the giant tyrant Geryon after three days and three nights of continuous battle. Hercules then—in a Celtic gesture—buried the head of Geryon with his weapons and ordered that a city be built on the site. The lighthouse atop a skull and crossbones representing the buried head of Hercules’ slain enemy appears in the coat-of-arms of the city of A Coruña.

Another legend embodied in the 11th-century Irish compilation —the "Book of Invasions"—King Breogán, the founding father of the Galician Celtic nation, constructed a massive tower of such a grand height that his sons could see a distant green shore from its top. The glimpse of that distant green land lured them to sail north to Ireland. According to the legend, Breogán's descendants stayed in Ireland and are the Celtic ancestors of the current Irish people. A colossal statue of Breogán has been erected near the Tower.

Throughout the Middle Ages multiple naval crusading itineraries to the Holy Land mentioned the obligatory stopover at the Lighthouse. Usually, the crusader fleets would disembark there to reach the shrine of the Apostle James the Greater at Santiago de Compostela on foot.  and  helped to perpetuate the legend that the lighthouse had been built by Julius Caesar perhaps by a misreading of the ancient inscription.

Possible locations of Brigantia

Early geographical descriptions on the location of Brigantia point out that the town could be actually located in A Coruña or in the locality of the modern town of Betanzos. There is some debate about this, as the people from Betanzos claim it as a fact that Betanzos was referred to as "the former city of Brigancia" until the 17th century, both in literary accounts as well as in maps, and they also believe that the name Betanzos is a phonetical evolution from Brigantium > Breganzo > Betanzos. This, however, could be a false etymology.

The Betanzos tradition claims that the port of Betanzos was getting too small for the larger mediaeval ships, and that king Alfonso IX of León decided to create a bigger port nearby in the 13th century. The place he chose was an uninhabited place called Clunia, which later on evolved to Cruña and Coruña, and so (in English) to Corunna. The place name Clunia is believed to come from the Proto-Celtic root *klou̯ni (cf. Old Irish cluain), meaning meadow.

However, the A Coruña tradition maintains that the "port" of Betanzos (which is a fluvial one, in a quite small river) was far too small for Roman warships to dock at, for example when Julius Caesar visited this area  with "more than a hundred triremes". It is demonstrated that A Coruña was an important Roman site, as graveyards and other Roman remains have been found in the city centre, demonstrating that the site was inhabited in the Roman period, and was deserted only during the early Middle Ages due to Viking attacks, when its people moved inland to O Burgo (now Culleredo). The proponents of A Coruña also explain the different name as a change that occurred in the Middle Ages, and point out that the lighthouse, which was called "Pharum Brigantium", was erected in A Coruña, and is at least 25 km (or a day's walk) from Betanzos.

Also in A Coruña there was the tribe of the Brigantes, in Betanzos the tribe of the Nemeti. Today almost all historians agree that Brigantia is A Coruña. Brigantia is not only A Coruña; today it is believed that Brigantia was located from A Coruña until A Laracha and Carballo in the Bergantiños region (Brigantes > Brigantinos > Bergantiños undoing the modification of medieval Galician).

Gallery

See also
Roman architecture
Roman engineering
Roman technology
List of Roman sites in Spain
List of World Heritage Sites in Spain
List of lighthouses in Spain

References
Specific references

General references

"Documentos para estudiar la Torre de Hércules" (in Spanish)
Mareblucamogli.com
Tower of Hercules from Spain.info
Torre de Hércules  (in English) from the Universidade da Coruña website
Tower of Hercules Visitor Services and Interpretive Center (in English)

External links

 Torre photo
 Official website
 Images of the Roman Tower of Hercules and futuristic visual legends
 Historical timeline of the Tower of Brigantia, from galicianflag.com

Lighthouses completed in the 2nd century
Towers completed in the 2nd century
Lighthouses in Galicia (Spain)
Buildings and structures in the Province of A Coruña
World Heritage Sites in Spain
Ancient Roman buildings and structures in Spain
Tourist attractions in Galicia (Spain)
Bien de Interés Cultural landmarks in the Province of A Coruña
History of A Coruña